The 1946 Minnesota Intercollegiate Athletic Conference football season was the season of college football played by the eight member schools of the Minnesota Intercollegiate Athletic Conference (MIAC), sometimes referred  to as the Minnesota College Conference, as part of the 1946 college football season. 

The Gustavus Adolphus Golden Gusties, in their second season under head coach Lloyd Hollingsworth, won the MIAC championship with a 7–0–1 record (6–0 against MIAC opponents). The Gusties led the conference in scoring offense (23.4 points per game) and defense (6.5 point per game) also dominated the 1946 All-MIAC football team, claiming eight of eleven first-team positions.

Conference overview

Teams

Gustavus Adolphus

The 1946 Gustavus Adolphus Golden Gusties football team represented Gustavus Adolphus College of St. Peter, Minnesota. In their second, non-consecutive year under head coach Lloyd Hollingsworth, the Gusties compiled a 7–0–1 record (6–0 against MIAC teams), won the MIAC championship, and outscored opponents by a total of 187 to 52.

Gustavus Adolphus players took eight of the eleven first-team spots on the 1946 All-MIAC football team. The Gustavus Adolphus honorees were: back Babe Fiebiger; halfback Bob Collison; fullback Bennie Langsjoen; center Harold Swanson; end William Haldy; tackles Vic Pedersen and Gerald Cady; and guard Keith Skogman.

St. Olaf

The 1946 St. Olaf Oles football team represented Gustavus Adolphus College of Northfield, Minnesota. Led by head coach Adrian Christianson, the Oles compiled a 6–2 record (3–1 against MIAC teams), finished in a tie for second place in the MIAC, and outscored opponents by a total of 104 to 91.

St. Thomas

The 1946 St. Thomas Tommies football team represented the University of St. Thomas of St. Paul, Minnesota. In their first year under head coach Frank Deig, the Tommies compiled a 4–3 record (3–1 against MIAC teams), finished in a tie for second place in the MIAC, and outscored opponents by a total of 94 to 70.

Concordia

The 1946 Concordia Cobbers football team represented Concordia College of Moorhead, Minnesota. In their sixth year under head coach Jake Christiansen, the Cobblers compiled a 3–3–1 record (2–2 against MIAC teams), finished in fourth place in the MIAC, and were outscored by a total of 92 to 91.

Saint John's

The 1946 Saint John's Johnnies football team represented Saint John's University of Collegeville, Minnesota. In their 11th year under head coach Joe Benda, the Johnnies compiled a 5–3 record (2–4 against MIAC teams), finished in fifth place in the MIAC, and outscored opponents by a total of 131 to 73.

Saint Mary's

The 1946 Saint Mary's Redmen football team represented Saint Mary's College of Winona, Minnesota. In their eighth year under head coach Eddie Suech, the Redmen compiled a 4–3–1 record (1–2–1 against MIAC teams), finished in sixth place in the MIAC, and outscored opponents by a total of 91 to 84.

Augsburg

The 1946 Augsburg Auggies football team represented Augsburg University of Minneapolis. In their third year under head coach Robert S. Carlson, the Auggies compiled a 1–6 record (1–5 against MIAC teams), finished in seventh place in the MIAC, and were outscored by a total of 118 to 26.

Macalester

The 1946 Macalester Scots football team represented Macalester College of Saint Paul, Minnesota. In their third year under head coach Dwight Stuessy, the Scots compiled a 1–6–1 record (0–4–1 against MIAC teams), finished in eighth place in the MIAC, and were outscored by a total of 124 to 25.

All-conference team
First team
 Backs: Jack Salscheider, St. Thomas; Babe Fiebiger, Gustavus Adolphus; Bob Collison, Gustavus Adolphus; Beanie Langsjoen, Gustavus  Adolphus
 Ends: Ralph Opatz, St. John's; William Haldy, Gustavus Adolphus
 Tackles: Vic Pedersen, Gustavus Adolphus; Gerald Cady, Gustavus Adolphus
 Guards:  Stan Tostengaard, St. Olaf; Keith Skogman Gustavus Adolphus
 Center: Harold Swanson, Gustavus Adolphus

Second team
 Backs: Royal Peterson, St. Olaf; Dave Dillon, Augsburg; Charles Miller, St. John's; Ronald Malcolm, Gustavus Adolphus
 Ends: Henry Epstein, St. Mary's; Charles Beck, Concordia
 Tackles: Konnie Prem, St. John's; Eldon Lehrke, St. Olaf
 Guards: Ronald Henricksen, St. Olaf; Clarence Modin, Concordia
 Center: Tony Graham, St. Mary's

References